Cornus excelsa is a species of flowering plant in the dogwood genus (Cornus). It is native to mountain forests of Mexico, Guatemala, and Honduras.

Description
Cornus excelsa is a tree which grows up to 12 meters tall, with a trunk up to 15 cm in diameter.

Range and habitat
Cornus excelsa is found in the mountains of Mexico and northern Central America, including the Sierra Madre Oriental, southern Sierra Madre Occidental, Trans-Mexican Volcanic Belt, Sierra Madre de Oaxaca, Sierra Madre del Sur, and Chiapas Highlands of Mexico, the Sierra Madre de Chiapas of Mexico and Guatemala, and the Guatemalan Highlands of Guatemala and Honduras.

It is typically found in cloud forests, where it is a common early successional tree found in secondary vegetation. It is also found on ridges and slopes in montane oak and pine–oak forests. It ranges from 1,500 to 2,800 meters elevation.

Seedlings can be readily grown from chemically scarified seeds.

References

excelsa
Cloud forest flora of Mexico
Flora of the Sierra Madre Occidental
Flora of the Sierra Madre Oriental
Flora of the Sierra Madre de Oaxaca
Flora of the Sierra Madre del Sur
Flora of the Trans-Mexican Volcanic Belt
Flora of the Chiapas Highlands
Sierra Madre de Chiapas
Flora of the Central American montane forests
Flora of the Central American pine–oak forests
Trees of Mexico
Trees of Guatemala
Trees of Honduras
Plants described in 1820